Buffalo Narrows Airport  is located  east-southeast of Buffalo Narrows, Saskatchewan, Canada.

Courtesy Air (formerly called Buffalo Narrows Airways Ltd.) is based out of the airport, where it operates its maintenance facilities and provides scheduled flights from Lloydminster and to Key Lake Airport and Collins Bay Airport.

Voyage Air maintains a base at the airport, including hangar and maintenance facilities for its Turbo Otter and DeHavilland Beaver.

See also 
Buffalo Narrows Water Aerodrome
Buffalo Narrows (Fire Centre) Heliport
List of airports in Saskatchewan

References

External links
Page about this airport on COPA's Places to Fly airport directory

Certified airports in Saskatchewan